Tod Andrews (born Theodore Edwin Anderson; November 9, 1914 – November 7, 1972) was an American stage, screen, and television actor.

Early years
Tod Andrews was born as Theodore Edwin Anderson in El Paso, Texas,  to Henry Anderson and Lydia A. Anderson (née Apodaca; later Silverman, who wed in Pima, Arizona, on November 18, 1913. Tod and his sister, Gertrude Anderson Pierucci, were raised in southern California; both suffered untimely deaths, predeceasing their mother, Lydia. Andrews graduated from Los Angeles High School and Washington State College.

Career

Stage
Andrews began his career as Michael Ames at the Pasadena Playhouse and moved to New York City to appear onstage. Andrews acted with the Margo Jones Company in New York City from 1944 to 1948, when he was spotted by Joshua Logan. When Henry Fonda left the title role in Mister Roberts, Logan gave Andrews the part in the road production.

On Broadway, Andrews played in Summer and Smoke (1948-1949) and A Girl Can Tell. Billed as Michael Ames, he was in Quiet, Please! (1940), My Sister Eileen (1940-1943), Storm Operation (1944), Mrs. Kimball Presents (1944), Public Relations (1944), and That Old Devil (1944).

Film

He returned to films in 1965, appearing as Captain Tuthill in Otto Preminger's World War II action blockbuster In Harm's Way. In 1968, Andrews appeared on film in Ted Post's Hang 'Em High as a defense attorney. Two years later, he worked again with Post in Beneath the Planet of the Apes, as James Franciscus's dying commanding officer, Colonel 'Skipper' Maddox. His final screen appearance was as a doctor in 1973's The Baby, also directed by Post.

Television
Andrews' television performances included a starring role from 1957 to 1958 in the syndicated series of the American Civil War, The Gray Ghost, based on the heroic Confederate Colonel John Singleton Mosby. In 1959, he starred in the 13-episode Counterthrust, a syndicated series "in which he played a secret agent in the Far East battling Communism".

Andrews did a screen test for the Perry Mason 1950s TV series playing Perry Mason opposite Raymond Burr as Hamilton Burger. This and other screen tests for that show were released on the Perry Mason 50th Anniversary 3-DVD set from 2008.

Andrews was cast as Captain Lynn Parker in the 1960 episode, "Yankee Confederate," on the syndicated anthology series, Death Valley Days, hosted by Stanley Andrews. In the story line, Parker is assigned by General Ulysses Grant (Stan Jones) to infiltrate a Confederate spy ring masterminded by Belle Waverly (Elaine Devry). Gavin MacLeod played Belle's fiancé, Dandy Martin, who shoots her to death because she developed romantic feelings for Captain Parker. 

He was cast in two episodes of the CBS sitcom, The Andy Griffith Show and in the 1962 series finale, "The Hoax," of the ABC adventure series, Straightaway, starring Brian Kelly and John Ashley. 

In 1962, he portrayed the part of Holt in the episode "The Devil and the Deep Blue" on CBS's Rawhide. In 1964, he appeared in "The Bewitchin' Pool", the last original broadcast episode of The Twilight Zone. In 1973, Andrews played the U.S. President in the made-for-TV political thriller, The President's Plane is Missing.

Recognition
Andrews won a Theatre World Award in 1949 for his work in Summer and Smoke.

Personal life
Andrews was married three times, to Gloria Eleanor Folland (December 3, 1921 – October 28, 1991), Alice Kirby Hooker, and Karolyn Rainwater (1943-1993). The first two marriages ended in divorce, and he was married to Rainwater when he died. In early August 1961 Tod Andrews (reference: Tod Andrews Takes Overdose,  NY (AP) August 6, 1961) was hospitalized following a suicide attempt. According to an AP article published August 6, 1961, Tod Andrews was hospitalized at Lenox Hill Hospital after an overdose of sleeping pills. It was reported that he had phoned a friend to say he was going to kill himself and was subsequently found slumped in a chair in the apartment of a female friend. He was hospitalized on a Saturday in critical condition but taken off the critical list later the same day. On August 15th 1961, an article by Dorothy Kilgallen in Voice of Broadway noted that friends of Andrews were "still mystified about his headlined suicide attempt." as only hours earlier he had apparently been "having a cheerful time at Danny's Hideaway" talking about the "great year he had coming up on Broadway and in TV and announced his engagement to Valerie Veigal." (ref: Dorothy Kilgallen Voice of Broadway, in Olean Times Herald, Aug 15 1967 page 13)

Death
Andrews died of a heart attack on November 7, 1972, in Los Angeles, two days before his 58th birthday. He was buried in Holy Cross Cemetery in Culver City. He was survived by, among others, his wife Karolyn, at least two children (some sources indicate three children), and his mother. Some sources indicate his father survived him as well but his father's year of death has not been established.

Filmography

Film
Dive Bomber (1941) as Telephone Man (film debut, uncredited)
International Squadron (1941) as Michele Edmé
They Died with Their Boots On (1941) as Cadet Brown (uncredited)
The Body Disappears (1941) as Bill
Dangerously They Live (1941) as Dr. Craig (uncredited)
Captains of the Clouds (1942) as Student Pilot 
Bullet Scars (1942) as Joe Madison
The Male Animal (1942) as Student (uncredited)
I Was Framed (1942) as Ken Marshall (Scott) 
Murder in the Big House (1942) as Dapper Dan Malloy 
Spy Ship (1942) as Gordon Morrel
Now, Voyager (1942) as Dr. Dan Regan (uncredited)
Truck Busters (1943) as Dave Todd
Action in the North Atlantic (1943) as Ahearn (uncredited)
Heaven Can Wait (1943) as Jack Van Cleve
Voodoo Man (1944) as Ralph Dawson
Return of the Ape Man (1944) as Steve Rogers 
The Last Ride (1944) as Fritz Hummel 
Outrage (1950) as Rev. Bruce Ferguson
Between Heaven and Hell (1956) as Lt. Ray Mosby
From Hell It Came (1957) as Dr. William Arnold
In Harm's Way (1965) as Captain Tuthill
Hang 'Em High (1968) as Defense Attorney
Beneath the Planet of the Apes (1970) as Skipper
The Baby (1973) as Doctor
The President's Plane Is Missing (1973,TV) (final film)

Television

 The Gray Ghost (1957-1958) as Maj. John Mosby/The Gray Ghost 
 One Step Beyond (1959) as Lt. Cmdr. Stacey 
 Checkmate (1960-1962) as George Harris/Dr. James Low 
 Death Valley Days (1960-1968) as Captain Lynn Parker/William C. Ralston 
 77 Sunset Strip (1961) as Jim Breck
 Gunsmoke (1961) as Myles Cody 
 Frontier Circus (1961) as Jeff Andrews 
 The Andy Griffith Show (1961-1968) as Ralph Case/Mr. Franklin 
 Rawhide (1962) as Holt
 The Twilight Zone (1964) as Gil Sharewood
 The F.B.I. (1969) as Ed Franklin
 Bright Promise (1969) as Dean Henry Pierce #1 
 The Bold Ones: The Lawyers (1970) as Ted Hollister 
 Ironside (1970) as Man
 Ghost Story (1972) as Andrew Burgess
 Banacek (1972) as Graves (last appearance)

References

External links

Tod Andrews profile, Answers.com; accessed September 21, 2017.
Tod Andrews profile, MovieTome.com; accessed September 21, 2017.

1914 births
1972 deaths
Male actors from California
Male actors from New York (state)
American male film actors
American male stage actors
American male television actors
Burials at Holy Cross Cemetery, Culver City
20th-century American male actors